Flour Lake is a lake in Cook County, Minnesota, in the United States.

Flour Lake was named from the fact government surveyors left a supply of flour there.

See also
List of lakes in Minnesota

References

Lakes of Minnesota
Lakes of Cook County, Minnesota